The 18th parallel south is a circle of latitude that is 18 degrees south of the Earth's equatorial plane. It crosses the Atlantic Ocean, Africa, the Indian Ocean, Australasia, the Pacific Ocean and South America.

Around the world
Starting at the Prime Meridian and heading eastwards, the parallel 18° south passes through:

{| class="wikitable plainrowheaders"
! scope="col" width="125" | Co-ordinates
! scope="col" | Country, territory or ocean
! scope="col" | Notes
|-
| style="background:#b0e0e6;" | 
! scope="row" style="background:#b0e0e6;" | Atlantic Ocean
| style="background:#b0e0e6;" |
|-
| 
! scope="row" | 
|
|-
| 
! scope="row" | 
|
|-
| 
! scope="row" | 
| Caprivi Strip
|-
| 
! scope="row" | 
|
|-
| 
! scope="row" | 
| Caprivi Strip
|-
| 
! scope="row" | 
|
|-
| 
! scope="row" | 
| Caprivi Strip
|-
| 
! scope="row" | 
|
|-
| 
! scope="row" | 
|
|-
| 
! scope="row" | 
| For about 3 km
|-
| 
! scope="row" | 
|
|-
| 
! scope="row" | 
|
|-
| 
! scope="row" | 
| Passing just south of Harare
|-
| 
! scope="row" | 
| 
|-
| style="background:#b0e0e6;" | 
! scope="row" style="background:#b0e0e6;" | Indian Ocean
| style="background:#b0e0e6;" | Mozambique Channel
|-
| 
! scope="row" | 
|
|-
| style="background:#b0e0e6;" | 
! scope="row" style="background:#b0e0e6;" | Indian Ocean
| style="background:#b0e0e6;" |
|-
| 
! scope="row" | 
| Western Australia
|-
| style="background:#b0e0e6;" | 
! scope="row" style="background:#b0e0e6;" | Indian Ocean
| style="background:#b0e0e6;" | Roebuck Bay - passing just south of Broome, Western Australia 
|-valign="top"
| 
! scope="row" | 
| Western Australia Northern Territory Queensland
|-valign="top"
| style="background:#b0e0e6;" | 
! scope="row" style="background:#b0e0e6;" | Pacific Ocean
| style="background:#b0e0e6;" | Passing through 's Coral Sea Islands Territory Passing just south of Efate island, 
|-
| style="background:#b0e0e6;" | 
! scope="row" style="background:#b0e0e6;" | Pacific Ocean
| style="background:#b0e0e6;" | 
|-
| 
! scope="row" | 
| Island of Viti Levu
|-
| style="background:#b0e0e6;" | 
! scope="row" style="background:#b0e0e6;" | Pacific Ocean
| style="background:#b0e0e6;" | Koro Sea
|-
| 
! scope="row" | 
| Island of Gau
|-
| style="background:#b0e0e6;" | 
! scope="row" style="background:#b0e0e6;" | Pacific Ocean
| style="background:#b0e0e6;" | Koro Sea
|-
| 
! scope="row" | 
| Island of Nayau
|-valign="top"
| style="background:#b0e0e6;" | 
! scope="row" style="background:#b0e0e6;" | Pacific Ocean
| style="background:#b0e0e6;" | Passing just north of Fonualei,  Passing just north of Palmerston Island,  Passing just south of the islands of Tahiti, Mehetia and Reitoru, 
|-
| 
! scope="row" | 
| Marokau atoll
|-valign="top"
| style="background:#b0e0e6;" | 
! scope="row" style="background:#b0e0e6;" | Pacific Ocean
| style="background:#b0e0e6;" | Passing between the atolls of Hao and Amanu, 
|-
| 
! scope="row" | 
|
|-
| 
! scope="row" | 
|
|-
| 
! scope="row" | 
|
|-valign="top"
| 
! scope="row" | 
| Mato Grosso do Sul Mato Grosso - for about 11 km Mato Grosso do Sul - for about 9 km Mato Grosso - for about 16 km Mato Grosso do Sul - for about 22 km Mato Grosso - for about 18 km Goiás Minas Gerais Espírito Santo Bahia
|-
| style="background:#b0e0e6;" | 
! scope="row" style="background:#b0e0e6;" | Atlantic Ocean
| style="background:#b0e0e6;" |
|}

See also
17th parallel south
19th parallel south

s18